Catherine Webb (born 1986) is a British author. She also writes fantasy novels for adults under the name Kate Griffin, and she writes science fiction as Claire North.

Life
Webb was educated at the Godolphin and Latymer School, London, and the London School of Economics.

She was 14 years old when she completed Mirror Dreams, which was written during her school holidays. Her father is author and publisher Nick Webb, and he suggested she should send the manuscript to an agent he knew, who eventually offered to represent her. The book was published in 2002 by Atom Books, and Webb was named Young Trailblazer of the Year by the magazine CosmoGirl UK. She has published eight young adult novels, all with Atom Books, and studied at the Royal Academy of Dramatic Art, from which she graduated in 2010.

A lifelong Londoner, Webb enjoys walking through the areas she describes in her books – Bethnal Green, Clerkenwell, and along the River Thames – comparing the city of London as it is now with how it was at various times in the past. She appeared in CosmoGirl in 2006/7 in an interview. She also appeared in online interviews with CBBC and nzgirl when she was 15, and also with The Daily Telegraph, which described her as a teen queen.

Bibliography
 Mirror Dreams (2002)
 Mirror Wakes (2003)
 Waywalkers (2003)
 Timekeepers (2004)
 The Extraordinary and Unusual Adventures of Horatio Lyle (2006)
 The Obsidian Dagger: Being the Further Extraordinary Adventures of Horatio Lyle (2006)
 The Doomsday Machine: Another Astounding Adventure of Horatio Lyle (2008)
 The Dream Thief: An Extraordinary Horatio Lyle Mystery (2010)

As Kate Griffin
 A Madness of Angels (2009) (Matthew Swift series, book 1)
 The Midnight Mayor (2010) (Matthew Swift series, book 2)
 The Neon Court (2011) (Matthew Swift series, book 3)
 The Minority Council (2012) (Matthew Swift series, book 4)
 Stray Souls (2012) (Magicals Anonymous series, book 1)
 The Glass God (2013) (Magicals Anonymous series, book 2)

As Claire North
 The First Fifteen Lives of Harry August (2014)
 Touch (2015)
 The Gameshouse (2015)
 The Sudden Appearance of Hope (2016)
 The End of the Day (2017)
 84K (22 May 2018)
 The Pursuit of William Abbey (2019)
 Notes from the Burning Age (2021)
 Ithaca (2022)

Awards and nominations
 2005, Timekeepers nominated for the Carnegie Medal
 2006, The Extraordinary and Unusual Adventures of Horatio Lyle nominated for the Carnegie Medal
 2014, The First Fifteen Lives of Harry August (as Claire North) nominated for the BSFA Award for Best Novel
 2015, The First Fifteen Lives of Harry August (as Claire North) won the John Campbell Memorial Award for Best Science Fiction Novel of the Year
 2015, The First Fifteen Lives of Harry August (as Claire North) nominated for the Arthur C. Clarke Award for Best Science Fiction Novel
 2017,  The Sudden Appearance of Hope (as Claire North) won the World Fantasy Award for novel

References

External links
 Catherine Webb at Little, Brown Book Group
 
 Interview with "Kate Griffin"
 Kate Griffin's official Web site and blog
 'Young Adult' – an Interview with Catherine Webb
 The story behind The First Fifteen Lives of Harry August – Online Essay by Claire North

British children's writers
1986 births
People educated at Godolphin and Latymer School
Alumni of the London School of Economics
Living people
English fantasy writers
English historical novelists
British child writers
Alumni of RADA
World Fantasy Award-winning writers
British women novelists